Guido Randisi (born Rosario, 18 June 1989) is an Argentine rugby union footballer. His usual position is as a Prop, and he currently plays for Valorugby Emilia.

After playing for Argentina XV squad for and 2015 World Rugby Nations Cup, in 2015 we was named part of Argentina squad for summer international tests.

References

External links 
It's Rugby England Profile
Eurosport Profile
ESPN Profile

1989 births
Living people
Valorugby Emilia players
Rugby union props
Sportspeople from Rosario, Santa Fe